The King's Face (Hanja: 王의 얼굴) is a 2014 South Korean television series starring Seo In-guk, Jo Yoon-hee, Lee Sung-jae, Kim Gyu-ri and Shin Sung-rok. It aired on KBS2 from November 19, 2014 to February 5, 2015 on Wednesdays and Thursdays at 21:55 for 23 episodes.

Plot
Gwanghae, the child of a concubine, becomes the Crown Prince of Joseon. For the next 16 years, the illegitimate prince lives through turbulent times, enduring death threats and possible dethronement. Gwanghae has a contentious relationship with his father King Seonjo, and the two eventually become rivals in politics and love. Using physiognomy as a weapon and means to gain power, Gwanghae enlists a face-reading fortuneteller to help him become the next King.

Cast
Seo In-guk as Prince Gwanghae
Jo Yoon-hee as Kim Ga-hee
Jeon Min-seo as young Kim Ga-hee
Lee Sung-jae as King Seonjo
Kim Gyu-ri as Lady Gwi-in of the Kim clan
Shin Sung-rok as Kim Do-chi
Go Won-hee as Queen Inmok
Im Ji-eun as Queen Uiin
Kim Hee-jung as Deposed Queen Yu 
Choi Seung-hoon as Deposed Crown Prince Yi Ji
Park Joo-hyung as Prince Imhae
Yoon Bong-gil as Im Young-shin
Jo Won-hee as Kim Du-seo
Kim Hyun-sook as Lady Park
Ahn Suk-hwan as Yi San-hae
Song Min-hyung as Yoo Seung
Lee Chung as Yoo Ja-shin
Kim Bang-won as Kang Jin-yeol
Ji Seo-yoon as Hong Sook-yong
Won Deok-hyun as Prince Sinseong
Seo Hyunseok as Prince Jeongwon
Park Joon-mok as young Prince Jeongwon
Joo Jin-mo as Jeong Cheol
Lee Byung-joon as Kim Gong-ryang
Min Song-ah as Court Lady Park
Lee Soon-jae as Baek Kyung
Kim Myung-gon as Eunuch Song
Lee Ki-young as Go San
Choi Cheol-ho as Jeong Yeo-rip
Yoon Jin-ho as Seo Yong
Lee Sang-in as Jin Young
Im Soo-hyun as Song Wol
Park Jae-min as Bong Du
Choi Kang-won as Oh Gil
Jung Moon-yup as Sam Gil
Oh Eun-ho as Court lady Oh
Go In-beom as Jang Soo-tae
Baek Jae-jin as Mu Cheol
Yoon Bit-na as Kyung San
Kim Yeol as Kap-yi
Kim Seo-jung as Yeon-joo

Awards and nominations

Plagiarism controversy
On August 25, 2014, Jupiter Film, the production company of the 2013 film The Face Reader, filed for an injunction in court for infringement of copyright and unfair competition against KBS, asking that the network not be allowed to air their unauthorized remake. According to Jupiter Film, they own the rights to the original script for The Face Reader with a "one source multi use" clause, for the express purpose of producing a film, a book series, and a television series based on the story about a face-reading fortuneteller who gets caught up in a political battle for the throne. The film sold 9 million tickets in 2013, and two books in the series (backstories for the characters in the film) have been released thus far. Jupiter Film said they approached KBS Media in 2012 about a 24-episode TV drama adaptation of The Face Reader and handed over scripts and outlines, and mentioned War of Money screenwriter Lee Hyang-hee as a good candidate for penning the remake. But KBS Media and Jupiter Film could not agree on terms and negotiations fell through. Jupiter Film alleged that after KBS Media backed out of the deal, the latter took the idea and made their own version, including hiring the screenwriter they'd suggested.

KBS in turn issued the following statement: "The King's Face is a totally different drama in people, era, and setting, with different plot and conflict structure, and mode of expression from The Face Reader." While waiting for the court's final decision, KBS decided to go ahead with the production and made casting announcements. The court ruling in November 2014 was in KBS's favor, stating that there was no plagiarism involved.

International broadcast
  Myanmar – MRTV-4 (2015)
 Thailand – Channel 3 (January 10, 2017)

References

External links
  
 
 

2014 South Korean television series debuts
2015 South Korean television series endings
Korean Broadcasting System television dramas
Gwanghaegun of Joseon
South Korean historical television series
Television series by KBS Media